Leichtes Gepäck (Light Luggage) is the fifth studio album by German band Silbermond. It was released on 27 November 2015 by Verschwende deine Zeit GmbH.

Track listing
All songs written by Thomas Stolle, Johannes Stolle, Andreas Nowak, and Stefanie Kloß.

Charts

Weekly charts

Year-end charts

Certifications and sales

Release history

References

External links
 Silbermond.de – official site

2015 albums
Silbermond albums